The 2016 Atlantic Coast Conference men's soccer season was the 63rd season of men's varsity soccer in the conference.

The Wake Forest Demon Deacons and the Syracuse Orange are the defending regular season and tournament champions, respectively.

Changes from 2015 

 Jay Vidovich replaced Joe Luxbacher has the Pittsburgh Panthers head coach

Teams

Stadiums and locations 

1.  Florida State, Georgia Tech and Miami do not sponsor men's soccer

Personnel

Regular season

Rankings

National Soccer Coaches Association of America

Top Drawer Soccer

Postseason

ACC tournament

NCAA tournament

A record nine teams will participate in the NCAA tournament. Seven of the nine teams earned seeds and byes to the second round.

All-ACC awards and teams

Draft picks

The ACC had 18 total players selected in the 2017 MLS SuperDraft.  There were 7 players selected in the first round, 5 players selected in the second round, 4 players selected in the third round, and 2 players selected in the fourth round.  The 18 selections were the most selections from any conference in the draft.  ACC schools Louisville and Syracuse lead the league with 4 selections from each school.

See also 
 2016 NCAA Division I men's soccer season
 2016 ACC Men's Soccer Tournament
 2016 Atlantic Coast Conference women's soccer season

References 

 
2016 NCAA Division I men's soccer season